Atlas is the second studio album by the Mexican Avanzada Regia electropop band Kinky.  It was released on December 2, 2003, on Sonic360 (Nettwerk for the US and Canada).

Track 2, "The Headphonist" features vocals by John McCrea, lead singer of the American band CAKE.

Track listing
 "Presidente" – 3:22
 "The Headphonist" – 4:55
 "Snapshot" – 3:07
 "Salta-Lenin-El-Atlas" – 3:44
 "Do U Like It?" – 4:42
 "Airport Feelings" – 3:25
 "Pos Que Se Vengan" – 4:21
 "Minotauro" – 3:49
 "Not Afraid" – 3:09
 "My God Is So Quiet" – 3:01
 "María Jose" – 4:25
 "Semillas de Menta" – 2:53

References

2003 albums
Kinky (band) albums
Nettwerk Records albums